Hanna: Original Motion Picture Soundtrack is the soundtrack album to the 2011 British-German thriller film of the same name, directed by Joe Wright. The original score was composed by the English electronic music duo The Chemical Brothers. Initially the album was only released digitally, but it was released on CD on 4 July 2011.

NME ranked the album at number 54 in their list of the "61 of the Greatest Film Soundtracks".

Singles 
"Container Park" was released as a free download after the release of the initial download of Hanna and before the later CD release.

Critical reception 

The soundtrack received mostly positive responses from music critics, with many praising The Chemical Brothers for having produced solid background music. However a few critics have cited a lack of experimentation as one of the flaws. According to Metacritic, which assigns a normalised rating out of 100 to reviews from mainstream critics, the album holds a score of 65, indicating "generally favorable reviews", based on seven reviews all compiled from critics. Chad Grischow of IGN reserved high praise for the soundtrack, feeling that the "duo nail the mix of violence and innocence".

Track listing

Chart performance 

 No. 7 in the US Billboard Top Electronic Albums
 No. 11 in the US Billboard Top Soundtracks

References 

The Chemical Brothers albums
2011 soundtrack albums
Back Lot Music soundtracks